Eumorphia prostrata is a plant in the genus Eumorphia found in the eastern mountain regions of southern Africa, at an altitude of . It is distinguished by the silvery silky hairs that lie flat on its leaves.

Description
Euphorbia prostrata is similar to Eumorphia sericea, but is shorter, flatter, has shorter heads and rays, and a shinier and flattened coverage.

References

Anthemideae
Flora of Africa
Plants described in 1906